Amin Sarr (born 11 March 2001) is a Swedish professional footballer who plays as a forward for Ligue 1 club Lyon.

Club career

Malmö FF
Sarr signed his first professional contract with Malmö FF on 23 April 2020 in advance of the Allsvenskan season. He made his professional debut on 16 July, and scored his first goal on 2 August, in his first start, in a 3–0 win over IFK Göteborg. The following week, Sarr signed a contract extension to keep him at the club an additional two years, through 2023. Sarr made 17 appearances for the Allsvenskan champions in his first season, including six starts, scoring one goal. Sarr made just three appearances in the 2021 Allsvenskan with Malmö FF before being loaned out to fellow Allsvenskan side Mjällby AIF to seek increased playing time.

Loan to Mjällby AIF
Sarr was loaned to Mjällby AIF on 16 June 2021, and made his debut for the club two days later, scoring twice in a 3–2 defeat to IFK Göteborg.

Heerenveen
On 31 January 2022, Sarr signed a contract with Dutch club Heerenveen until mid-2025. He scored his first goal for the club against Heracles Almelo, scoring the first goal in a 2–0 win.

Lyon
On 30 January 2023, Lyon announced the signing of Sarr until 2027.

International career
Sarr was recalled to the Sweden national under-21 football team for the first time during their 2021 UEFA European Under-21 Championship qualifying matches in October 2020. He made his debut in the 10–0 defeat of Armenia, scoring a goal. Sarr is also eligible to represent The Gambia internationally, as his twin brother, goalkeeper Lamin, accepted a call-up with their senior team in the summer of 2021.

Career statistics

Honours

Malmö FF
Allsvenskan: 2020, 2021

References

External links
 Profile at the Olympique Lyonnais website
 Malmö FF profile 
 

Living people
2001 births
Swedish people of Gambian descent
Swedish footballers
Footballers from Skåne County
Association football forwards
Sweden youth international footballers
Sweden under-21 international footballers
Allsvenskan players
Eredivisie players
Ligue 1 players
Malmö FF players
Mjällby AIF players
SC Heerenveen players
Olympique Lyonnais players
Swedish expatriate footballers
Swedish expatriate sportspeople in the Netherlands
Expatriate footballers in the Netherlands
Swedish expatriate sportspeople in France
Expatriate footballers in France